Uwe Kreisel is a writer and textbook author in the fields of linguistics, ESL, and cross-cultural topics.

Bibliography 
 1992: English One. 
 1993: English Two. 
 1996: Net Jargon. 
 1997: E-mail English. 
 1997: Ultimate Idioms. 
 2000: Fluessiges Englisch. 
 8th edition published 2009.
 2002: American Slang in letzter Minute. 
 2003: Kulturschluessel USA.  
 2003: MultiLingua Classics: English One & Two, 2 CD-ROMs. 
 updated edition, 1st edition published 1995
 2004: Viimase minuti ameerika släng. 
 Estonian version of American Slang 2004: Kulturschluessel China. 
 2007: China erleben und verstehen. 
 2009: Smarte Sprüche: USA. 
 2011: Englisch ganz leicht. Urlaubskurs.''

External links 
 Uwe Kreisel's website

1961 births
Living people

Washington University in St. Louis alumni
German male writers